George Andrei Miron (born 28 May 1994) is a Romanian professional footballer who plays as a defender for Liga I club Universitatea Cluj.

Career statistics

Club
Statistics accurate as of match played 13 March 2023.

Honours

Club
FCSB
Cupa României: 2019–20
Supercupa României: Runner-up 2020

References

External links
 
 

1994 births
Living people
Romanian footballers
Association football defenders
Romania under-21 international footballers
Liga I players
ASC Oțelul Galați players
FC Botoșani players
FC Steaua București players
Hapoel Haifa F.C. players
FC Universitatea Cluj players
Israeli Premier League players
Sportspeople from Galați
Romanian expatriate footballers
Expatriate footballers in Israel
Romanian expatriate sportspeople in Israel